Thomas Walter Jernstedt  (November 24, 1944 – September 6, 2020) was an American basketball administrator, working for the NCAA from 1972 until 2010. He was enshrined into the National Collegiate Basketball Hall of Fame as a contributor in 2010 and the Naismith Memorial Basketball Hall of Fame in 2017. Jernstedt died in Tequesta, Florida.

Early life and education
Jernstedt was born in McMinnville, Oregon and raised in Carlton, Oregon and was a three-sport athlete at Yamhill Carlton High School.  He received his Bachelor of Science and Master of Science degrees from the University of Oregon in 1967 and 1973, respectively.  He was a football student-athlete while at Oregon, playing quarterback from 1964 to 1966 before injuries derailed his career.   He was named senior class president in 1966.  After graduation, Jernstedt spent two years in private business and then joined the athletic department at his alma mater, where he served in administrative positions between 1969 and 1972.

Career

NCAA
The NCAA hired Jernstedt in 1972 as a director of events.  He is credited with guiding the NCAA Men's Division I Basketball Championship to what it is today.  Jernstedt oversaw his first Final Four in March 1973.  He was promoted to assistant executive director in 1974. He held a number of senior-level management positions over the next 29 years, culminating in his appointment in 2003 as executive vice president.  Jernstedt's duties included everything from managing events and overseeing branding to negotiating TV and corporate-sponsorship contracts.  Jernstedt was let go after new NCAA President Mark Emmert took over in 2011.

In 2013, Jernstedt was selected to be a member of the first-ever College Football Playoff selection committee

USA basketball
Jernstedt first became associated with USA Basketball in 1975, serving as a member of its Council. Jernstedt was vice president for men from 1976-1980 and served another stint as vice president for men from 1992-1996. He was USA Basketball's vice president from 1997-2000 and was the organization's president from 2001-04.  Under Jernstedt's tenure, the men's basketball team had disappointing results with a sixth-place finish in the 2002 FIBA World Championship and a bronze finish at the 2004 Olympics, leading to changes in how the team was selected.

Awards and honors
2001 John Bunn Award, the highest honor given by the Naismith Memorial Basketball Hall of Fame
2009 USA Basketball's Edward S. Steitz Award

References

1944 births
2020 deaths
Oregon Ducks football players
National Collegiate Athletic Association people
National Collegiate Basketball Hall of Fame inductees
People from Carlton, Oregon
Players of American football from Oregon
Naismith Memorial Basketball Hall of Fame inductees
College Football Playoff Selection Committee members